Hold-up à l'italienne is a 2008 French television film directed and written by Claude-Michel Rome and starring Astrid Veillon, Bruno Wolkowitch, Étienne Chicot and Claudia Cardinale. The 96 minute action comedy was produced by Aubes Productions, AT-Production, and Radio Télévision Belge Francophone (RTBF).

References

External links

French television films
2008 films
2008 comedy films
2000s French films